Mkama Ndume Ruins (Magofu ya mji wa kale wa Mkama Ndume in Swahili )  was a medieval Swahili  settlement palace ruins located in Chake Chake District of Pemba South Region that was abandoned in the 16th Century prior to Portuguese arrival and is known for its fortification. The settlement was ruled by a leader named Mohammed bin Abdul Rahman, who was known for his cruelty towards his subjects thus earned his infamous nickname Mkama Ndume meaning milker of men in old Swahili. The settlement ruins bear this nickname.

See also
Historic Swahili Settlements
Swahili architecture
National Historic Sites in Tanzania

References

Ruins in Tanzania
Swahili people
Swahili city-states
Swahili culture
National Historic Sites in Tanzania
Archaeological sites in Tanzania
Archaeological sites of Eastern Africa